Dumb: The Story of Big Brother Magazine is an American documentary film that premiered on Hulu on June 3, 2017. Directed by Patrick O'Dell, it explores the rise and fall of the skateboarding magazine Big Brother.

Synopsis 
"A look at the rise and fall of the subversive skateboarding magazine Big Brother, which rose to prominence in the mid-1990s and had a profound effect on the skating subculture with its unfiltered approach."

Premise and persons featured 
The documentary chronicles the origin, creation, controversies, decline, cancellation and eventual legacy and friendships developed in the publication of the skateboard magazine Big Brother by tracking its evolution from a printed publication into home video releases and its eventual evolution into more successful fringe skateboard culture endeavors like CKY, Jackass, Ridiculousness and other TV and movie endeavors that continue being made. It features interviews from creators and editors Spike Jonze and Jeff Tremaine; prominent skateboarders Tony Hawk, Rob Dyrdek and Natas Kaupas; former subscribers and media personalities attracted to the magazine Jason Lee, Jonah Hill and Gavin Mcinnes; and related skate culture personalities Bam Margera, Steve-O and Johnny Knoxville.

Reception 
Dumb: The Story of Big Brother Magazine has received positive reviews from critics. On Rotten Tomatoes, it holds a 100% approval rating with an average rating of 6.3 out of 10 based on five reviews.

See also 
List of original programs distributed by Hulu

References

External links 

American documentary films
Hulu original films
2017 documentary films
Jackass (TV series)
2010s English-language films
2010s American films